The Unseen is a 2016 Canadian psychological horror film directed by Geoff Redknap and starring Aden Young, Camille Sullivan, Julia Sarah Stone, and Ben Cotton. It was released in 2016.

Plot
Bob Longmore (Aden Young) is suffering from  a mysterious disease which is causing his body to slowly become invisible. Having abandoned his family eight years earlier when the condition began emerging, he lives in a logging town in the far north of British Columbia, isolating himself as much as possible and keeping his body carefully covered whenever he does have to interact with people.

When his ex-wife Darlene (Camille Sullivan) calls him to discuss their troubled teenage daughter Eva (Julia Sarah Stone), he resolves to return to the city, but is forced to deliver a supply of drugs for Crisby (Ben Cotton) in exchange for the repair of his vehicle; the visit becomes further complicated when Eva disappears soon after his return, forcing him to juggle the drug delivery with trying to find his daughter.

Reception

Critical response 
On Rotten Tomatoes the film has an approval rating of 100% based on reviews from 9 critics.

Variety film critic Dennis Harvey wrote that the film "is ultimately middling as a quasi-sci-fi/horror suspense drama, but it has authentic grit as a story about one man’s struggle with alcoholism and depression." Writing for The Hollywood Reporter, John DeFore found the drug smuggling subplot unnecessary, but gave the film a favourable review overall and interpreted the invisibility plot as "a metaphor for a working class increasingly left out of society's decision-making processes".

Awards 
At the Vancouver Film Critics Circle Awards 2016, Stone was nominated for Best Supporting Actress in a Canadian Film.

The film was nominated at the 5th Canadian Screen Awards in 2017 for Best Sound Editing and Best Visual Effects.

It also received nine nominations at the 2017 Leo Awards, including Best Direction, Screenwriting and Cinematography.

References

External links
 

2016 films
2016 horror films
2010s psychological horror films
Canadian psychological horror films
Canadian supernatural horror films
English-language Canadian films
2010s supernatural horror films
2010s English-language films
2010s Canadian films